Victoria Wicks (born Beverly Victoria Anne Wicks; 18 April 1959) is a British actress. She is known for her role as Sally Smedley in Channel 4's comedy series Drop the Dead Donkey (1990–1998), Mrs. Gideon in The Mighty Boosh (2004), and the College Director in Skins (2007–08). Her film appearances include The Imitation Game (2014) and High-Rise (2015). She is an associate of Howard Barker's theatre company, The Wrestling School.

Biography

Early life and education 

Wicks was born Beverly Victoria Anne Wicks in Chippenham, Wiltshire, England, to Brian and Judith Wicks. Wicks's mother, Judith Bates, born 1933, was the second child of the writer H. E. Bates. Wicks is the niece of Jonathan Bates, a sound editor who died in 2008, and the television producer Richard Bates, who produced the television adaptation of The Darling Buds of May. Wicks is a director of Evensford Productions Ltd, the company set up in 1955 to protect and promote H. E. Bates's work.

Wicks trained at the Royal Welsh College of Music & Drama where she was awarded the Pernod and Bisquit Award for the most promising graduate.

Career 

Her first job was as acting assistant stage manager at Northampton Rep for a year, before going to Bristol Old Vic, Regent's Park and then the RSC. In 1988 Wicks was in Andy Hamilton's black comedy Tickets for the Titanic, and then went on to play Sally Smedley in all six series of Drop the Dead Donkey. The Mighty Boosh (a radio, television and stage show created by Noel Fielding and Julian Barratt) featured her in Series 1 as Mrs Gideon, the Head of Reptiles at the Zooniverse. Wicks also played Harriet Lawes, the Head of College in the first three series of Skins.

Wicks joined 'The Wrestling School' in 1996. The company was formed in 1988 for the sole purpose of performing the work of the dramatist Howard Barker. Since joining the company Wicks has appeared in nine plays by Barker, performing in London, Berlin, Stockholm, Copenhagen, Adelaide and also in Rouen, Grenoble, Le Mans and Paris for the co-production of Les Animaux en Paradis, which was performed in French by four British and five French actors. Wicks is an associate of The Wrestling School. In 2010 Wicks was invited to the Segal Theatre Center in New York as guest of Theatre Minima to celebrate a day-long event on the work of Howard Barker.

Wicks played the high priestess of the Sybillines in The Fires of Pompeii, a 2008 episode of Doctor Who. In 2014, she played Dorothy Clarke in The Imitation Game and Susannah Marshall in the E4 drama Glue (2014).

Personal life 
In 1984 Wicks married Peter Williams (divorced 2004); they have one daughter, Madelaine Rose, born 1985.

Credits

Work for Howard Barker

Television

Film

Theatre

Radio

References

External links 
 
 BBC Comedy Guide – Victoria Wicks
 Kilpatrick, David. Gertrude—The Cry (review). Theatre Journal – Volume 55, Number 4, December 2003, pp. 704–706. The Johns Hopkins University Press
 Guardian review of the 2002 production of Gertrude—The Cry

1959 births
20th-century English actresses
21st-century English actresses
Actresses from Wiltshire
Alumni of the Royal Welsh College of Music & Drama
Living people
English film actresses
English radio actresses
English stage actresses
English television actresses
People from Chippenham